The men's 4 × 400 metres relay at the 2022 World Athletics Indoor Championships took place on 20 March 2022.

Summary
Belgium, Spain and the Netherlands won their respective heats and qualified for the final automatically, with Spain clocking the fastest time. US anchor leg runner Isaiah Harris suffered an injury during the last lap and, despite finishing in second place, the US team did not make the final for the first time in the history of the World Athletics Indoor Championships. The Czech Republic, Poland and Great Britain were the next three fastest teams to make the final. This marked the first time in the history of the World Athletics Indoor Championships that the men's 4x400m relay final consisted entirely of European teams.

Spain was in the lead for the first two legs, with Belgium following closely behind. At the second exchange, Jonathan Sacoor got the baton in the first place, with Spain and Great Britain in second and third, respectively. Terrence Agard of the Netherlands, having received the baton in the fifth place, quickly made up ground on the leading teams and was at the front with the leader by the end of the first lap. On the back straight a gap opened up in lane one, which was quickly taken up by the accelerating Manuel Guijarro, immediately putting Spain back in the lead. At the final hand-off it was Spain, followed by Belgium and Great Britain. Spain's Bernat Erta quickly opened up a sizeable lead on the Belgium's veteran Kevin Borlée, but, in an exact replay of the events from three years ago at the 2019 European Indoor Championships in Glasgow, was overtaken by the more experienced Belgian with 100m to go. Belgium won their first World Indoor title in the event, Spain held on for silver and the accelerating Tony van Diepen secured bronze for the Netherlands. The defending champions Poland finished in fourth place.

Results

Heats
Qualification: First 1 in each heat (Q) and the next 3 fastest (q) advance to the Final.

The heats were started at 11:10.

Final

Final was started at 19:40.

References

4 x 400 metres relay
4 × 400 metres relay at the World Athletics Indoor Championships